Nall may refer to:
 Fred Nall Hollis (born 1948), American artist known as "Nall"
Nall, Pakistan, town in Khuzdar district, Balochistan, Pakistan
Nall River, river in Balochistan, Pakistan